Jonathan Child (January 30, 1785 – October 27, 1860) was an American businessman and politician. He 
was the first Mayor of Rochester, New York and son-in-law of Colonel Nathaniel Rochester.

Early life
Child was born in New Hampshire, and in 1805, at the age of 20, he moved to Utica, New York. In 1810, he moved to Charlotte, New York, and then during the War of 1812, he moved to Bloomfield, New York, and opened up a store in part of a local tavern. While in Bloomfield, he met Sophia, the oldest daughter of Colonel Rochester.

Career
In 1816, Child was a representative to the New York State Assembly in Albany.  In 1820, he moved to Rochester and opened a store at the Four Corners there.  When the Erie Canal was completed, he operated a fleet of canal boats on those waters.  He later helped organize and build the Tonawanda Railroad, the first in Rochester.  In 1824, he became a trustee of the First Bank of Rochester, and in 1827, became a village trustee.

In June 1834, the Whig majority of the first Rochester city council, selected Child to be the first mayor – Rochester mayors were not elected by popular vote until 1840.  He resigned the next spring after newly elected Democrats in the city council authorized granting liquor licenses in Rochester.  After his resignation, Child built a mansion of Washington Street in Rochester, and using some of his canal boats, became an early importer of coal.

Death and legacy
After his wife Sophia died in 1850, Child moved to Buffalo, New York, where he died ten years later on October 27, 1860. His Rochester home was listed on the National Register of Historic Places in 1971 as part of the Jonathan Child House & Brewster-Burke House Historic District.

References

External links 

Blake McKelvey Rochester Mayors Before the Civil War, 1964

	

1785 births
1860 deaths
Burials at Mount Hope Cemetery (Rochester)
People from Charlotte, New York
Members of the New York State Assembly
Mayors of Rochester, New York
New York (state) Whigs
19th-century American politicians
Politicians from Utica, New York
Businesspeople from Utica, New York
People from Lyme, New Hampshire
19th-century American businesspeople